John David Eaton (4 October 1909 – 4 August 1973) was a Canadian businessman and a member of the Eaton family. He was the second son of Sir John Craig Eaton and Lady Eaton of Toronto, Ontario. He was married to Signy Stefansson, and they had four sons.

John David's grandfather was Timothy Eaton, founder of the Eaton's department store business. John David's father, Sir John, took on the role of president of the company after the founder died in 1907.

Life and career
John David grew up in Toronto on a large estate overlooking the city, which was called Ardwold. His mother, Lady Eaton, was a Toronto society matron and hosted many major functions at Ardwold.

Sir John died of pneumonia in 1922 at the age of 45. Since none of his children were old enough to take over the company at his death, Sir John's cousin (and Timothy Eaton's nephew), Robert Young Eaton, took over the presidency, a position which Lady Eaton would groom her own son for over the next ten years.

Since Sir John had two sons who could have taken over the family business (Timothy and John David), a codicil had been eventually put in his will that a 'contest' would determine which of the two boys would lead the company. Timothy was sent to the Winnipeg store, and John David went to Montreal. They ran their individual stores for one year, at which time a determination was made as to who had done the better job. The clear winner was John David. Timothy was given a sum of money, approximately C$2 million, as compensation for not getting the presidency and control of the company. He was also given a life-long store credit of 10% on purchases.

Timothy moved to England and became a bon vivant with the horses and hounds in Newmarket, Hertfordshire, prior to World War II. He spent nearly all of the money or loaned it out to others who never paid him back. He kept a small black book with the loans in it for the rest of his life. Eventually, he was called into the Eaton's export headquarters in London and was read the 'riot act'. He was going broke, and his inheritance was running out. He was put on a short leash and sent back to Canada, where he married his first wife, an Eaton's saleswoman. He was given a strict yearly pay-out, and eventually his inheritance returned to its former amount through company-administered investments. The saleswoman later divorced him and he married his second wife, Georgina. They moved to Aurora, Ontario, on Yonge Street North, across from St. Andrews College. Georgie subsequently died of cancer, and Timothy moved once again to England and married for the third time. He had no children. He died in 1986 and is buried in the Eaton family's mausoleum at Mount Pleasant Cemetery in Toronto, with his parents and siblings.

John David was 33 when he became president of Eaton's. He predeceased his brother Timothy in 1973. Control of the company then went to John David's sons, who ran it until the business closed in 1999.

External links
Eaton's article at Historica:The Canadian Encyclopedia

John David Eaton
1909 births
1973 deaths
Deaths from pneumonia in Ontario
Businesspeople from Toronto
Canadian people of Ulster-Scottish descent